Perilitus brevicollis is a species of parasitoid wasp in the family Braconidae. The host of this wasp is the blue willow beetle (Phratora vulgatissima), which is a pest in Europe.

References

Braconidae